is a train station in Muroran, Hokkaido, Japan.

Lines
Hokkaido Railway Company
Muroran Main Line Station M34

Adjacent stations

Railway stations in Hokkaido Prefecture
Railway stations in Japan opened in 1905